Shinjuku, Tokyo held an election to the local ward assembly on April 27, 2003, as part of the 15th unified local elections.

Candidates
Source:

Incumbents
, a 49-year-old woman
, a 47-year-old woman
, a 65-year-old man
, a 55-year-old man
, a 54-year-old man
, a 33-year-old woman
, a 38-year-old man
, a 69-year-old man
, a 47-year-old woman and later Tokyo Metropolitan Assemblywoman
, a 57-year-old man
, a 55-year-old woman
, a 37-year-old man
, a 55-year-old man
, a 51-year-old woman
, a 36-year-old woman
, a 66-year-old man
, a 57-year-old woman
, a 50-year-old man
, a 64-year-old man and later 2010 candidate for Shinjuku mayor.
, a 41-year-old man
, a 48-year-old man
, a 65-year-old man
, a 39-year-old man
, a 62-year-old man
, a 57-year-old man
, a 66-year-old woman
, a 59-year-old man
, a 37-year-old woman
, a 35-year-old man
, a 59-year-old man
, a 48-year-old woman
, a 50-year-old man
, a 55-year-old man
, a 60-year-old man
, a 59-year-old man

Newcomers
, a 46-year-old man
, a 60-year-old man
, a 45-year-old man
, a 45-year-old man
, a 31-year-old man
, a 38-year-old man
, a 59-year-old man
, a 42-year-old man
, a 57-year-old man
, a 50-year-old man
, a 41-year-old man
, a 64-year-old man and previously Shinjuku mayor candidate in 1999 and 2002.
, a 30-year-old man
, a 31-year-old man, later Tokyo Metropolitan Assemblyman and mayor of Shinjuku
Two of the male candidates, 54-year-old male  and 39-year-old male , were previously in this office.

Results

|-
! style="background-color:#E9E9E9;text-align:left;" |Parties
! style="background-color:#E9E9E9;text-align:right;" |Votes
! style="background-color:#E9E9E9;text-align:right;" |%
! style="background-color:#E9E9E9;text-align:right;" |Seats
|-
| style="text-align:left;" |New Komeito party (公明党, Kōmeitō)
| style="text-align:right;" | 
| style="text-align:right;" | 
| style="text-align:right;" | 9
|-
| style="text-align:left;" |Japanese Communist Party (日本共産党, Nihon Kyōsan-tō)
| style="text-align:right;" | 
| style="text-align:right;" | 
| style="text-align:right;" | 9
|-
| style="text-align:left;" |Liberal Democratic Party of Japan (自由民主党, Jiyū Minshutō)
| style="text-align:right;" | 
| style="text-align:right;" | 
| style="text-align:right;" | 8
|-
| style="text-align:left;" |Democratic Party of Japan (民主党, Minshutō)
| style="text-align:right;" | 
| style="text-align:right;" | 
| style="text-align:right;" | 3
|-
| style="text-align:left;" | New Socialist Party
| style="text-align:right;" | 
| style="text-align:right;" | 
| style="text-align:right;" | 1
|-
| style="text-align:left;" | Independents
| style="text-align:right;" | 
| style="text-align:right;" | 
| style="text-align:right;" | 8
|-
|style="text-align:left;background-color:#E9E9E9"|Total (turnout 40.52%)
|width="75" style="text-align:right;background-color:#E9E9E9"| 91,293
|width="30" style="text-align:right;background-color:#E9E9E9"| 100.00
|width="30" style="text-align:right;background-color:#E9E9E9"| 38
|-
| style="text-align:left;" colspan=4 |Source: Official results 
|}

Candidate results

References

Local elections in Japan
Shinjuku
2003 elections in Japan
April 2003 events in Japan
2003 in Tokyo